El Salvador does not recognize same-sex marriage, civil unions or any other legal union for same-sex couples. A proposal to constitutionally ban same-sex marriage and adoption by same-sex couples was rejected twice in 2006, and once again in April 2009 after the Farabundo Martí National Liberation Front (FMLN) refused to grant the measure the four votes it needed to be ratified.

Legal history

Constitutional attempts to ban same-sex marriage
The Constitution of El Salvador does not explicitly ban the recognition of same-sex marriages. Article 32 reads: "The legal foundation of the family is marriage and rests on the juridical equality of the spouses." However, article 11 of the Family Code of El Salvador states that marriage is the "union of a man and a woman".

In 2006, a constitutional amendment to ban the legal recognition of same-sex unions was proposed by opponents of same-sex marriage. The measure was backed by the conservative Christian Democratic Party, President Antonio Saca and several other parties; i.e. Democratic Change, the Front for Democratic Revolution and the National Conciliation Party. It was opposed, and thus defeated, by the Farabundo Martí National Liberation Front (FMLN). It failed to win enough votes to be formally ratified due opposition from several FMLN legislators. While the FMLN has consistently opposed attempts to amend the Constitution to prohibit same-sex marriage, citing their belief that such laws are discriminatory, the party has stated that it has no intention to legalize same-sex marriage.

On 30 April 2009, the Legislative Assembly of El Salvador approved a last-minute constitutional amendment to ban same-sex marriage by defining marriage as being between "a man and a woman" only and barring same-sex couples from adopting children. Civil rights groups vowed to fight the measure, which still needed to be voted on by other government branches before becoming law. The amendment eventually failed the same month. On 25 April 2012, another attempt to enact a constitutional ban on same-sex marriage and adoption by same-sex couples was introduced to the Legislative Assembly. The measure eventually failed on 8 February 2014, after receiving only 19 votes in favor of its ratification.

On 17 April 2015, a constitutional amendment to ban same-sex marriage was approved once again in the Assembly at first reading, with 47 votes in favor. To be successfully included in the Constitution, the law had to be ratified by a two-thirds majority of the Assembly, or 56 of its 84 members. In November 2016, following the filing of a lawsuit to legalize same-sex marriage, some conservative MPs renewed their efforts to pass the ban. In January 2018, the Constitutional Court declared the proposed amendment unlawful because of "procedural missteps".

Attempts to recognise same-sex unions

In August 2021, the government of President Nayib Bukele proposed constitutional changes to permit same-sex couples to marry, prohibit discrimination on the basis of sexual orientation and legalize abortion when the life of the mother is in danger. As constitutional reforms in El Salvador must be approved by two successive congresses to take effect, the earliest the law could be enacted would have been 2027. In December 2021, Bukele backtracked and ruled out possible constitutional reforms to legalize same-sex marriage.

Legal challenges
In August 2016, a law student filed a lawsuit with the Supreme Court of El Salvador seeking the nullification of article 11 of the Family Code, which defines marriage as the "union of a man and a woman". Calling the law discriminatory and explaining the lack of gendered terms used in Article 34 of the Constitution of El Salvador's summary of marriage, the lawsuit sought to allow same-sex couples to marry. On 20 December 2016, the Supreme Court dismissed the lawsuit on a legal technicality. A second lawsuit against article 11 was filed on 11 November 2016, but it was dismissed by the Supreme Court on procedural grounds on 17 January 2019.

On 9 August 2019, a case challenging article 11 of the Family Code was admitted to the Constitutional Court. Originally filed in 2016 by activist Gabriel Gasteazoro, the case alleges that the provisions outlawing same-sex marriages in the Family Code are unconstitutional. A ruling was expected in the first three months of 2020, but was not issued.

2018 Inter-American Court of Human Rights ruling
On January 9, 2018, in advisory opinion OC 24/7, the Inter-American Court of Human Rights (IACHR) ruled that countries signatory to the American Convention on Human Rights are required to allow same-sex couples to marry. The ruling states that:

El Salvador ratified the American Convention on Human Rights on 23 June 1978 and recognized the court's jurisdiction on 6 June 1995. In the wake of the ruling, LGBT groups have urged the Government of El Salvador to abide by the decision and legalise same-sex marriage.

Public opinion
According to a 2008 poll, 14% of Salvadorans supported same-sex marriage, while 80% were opposed and 6% were undecided. A 2010 poll revealed that El Salvador had some of the lowest support for legalizing same-sex marriage in Latin America, at 10%.

According to a Pew Research Center survey conducted between November 9 and December 17, 2013, 11% of Salvadorans supported same-sex marriage, while 81% were opposed.

The 2017 AmericasBarometer showed that 19% of Salvadorans supported same-sex marriage. The Society for Cultural Anthropology reported in 2019 that in addition to low public support the situation for LGBT Salvadorans is "nightmarish": "Normalized intrapersonal violence and sexism intersect with widely acceptable homophobia and transphobia, subjecting many to hostility and harm. Scholars have argued that violence in the country has historically hinged on and exacerbated patriarchal gender roles, dating back to the Spanish suppression of fluid sexual practices and gender identities among the Pipil through widespread wartime sexual violence in the twentieth century."

See also
LGBT rights in El Salvador
Recognition of same-sex unions in the Americas

Notes

References 

El Salvador
LGBT rights in El Salvador